Beñat Prados Díaz (born 8 February 2001) is a Spanish professional footballer who plays as a midfielder for CD Mirandés, on loan from Athletic Bilbao.

Club career
Born in Pamplona, Navarre, Prados joined Athletic Bilbao's youth setup in July 2015, from UDC Txantrea. He made his senior debut with the farm team during the 2018–19 season, in Tercera División.

Prados made his debut with the reserves on 26 October 2019, coming on as a late substitute for Oihan Sancet in a 4–1 Segunda División B home routing of Real Valladolid Promesas. Definitely promoted to the B-side in June 2020, he subsequently became a regular starter for the team, playing in 25 matches (play-offs included) of the 2020–21 campaign, scoring once in a 3–2 away success over SD Amorebieta on 6 February 2021.

On 14 May 2021, Prados renewed his contract until 2025. In June, he was called up by manager Marcelino to make the pre-season with the main squad.

On 14 July 2022, Prados moved on loan to Segunda División side CD Mirandés for the season. He made his professional debut on 13 August, starting in a 1–1 home draw against Sporting de Gijón.

Career statistics

References

External links

2001 births
Living people
Footballers from Pamplona
Spanish footballers
Association football midfielders
Segunda División players
Primera Federación players
Segunda División B players
Tercera División players
CD Basconia footballers
Bilbao Athletic footballers
CD Mirandés footballers
Spain youth international footballers